Scott Malcolm Plummer (born 1 August 1966) was an Australian cricketer who played List A cricket once for the Tasmania in the 1993/94 season.

External links
 

1966 births
Living people
Australian cricketers
Tasmania cricketers
Cricketers from Launceston, Tasmania